According to data from the 1989 Soviet census, the population of the USSR was 70% East Slavs, 17% Turkic peoples, and all other ethnic groups below 2%. Alongside the atheist majority of 60% there were sizable minorities of Russian Orthodox Christians (approx. 20%) and Muslims (approx. 15%).

History

Revolution and Civil war, 1917 - 1923 
Russia lost former territories of the Russian Empire with about 30 million inhabitants after the Russian Revolution of 1917 (Poland: 18 million; Finland: 3 million; Romania: 3 million; the Baltic states: 5 million and Kars to Turkey: 400 thousand). At least 2 million citizens of the former Russian Empire died in the course of the Russian Civil War of 1917–1923, and a further 1 to 2 million emigrated.

Great Patriotic War, 1941 - 1945 
During the Second World War on the Eastern Front, the Soviet Union lost an approximate 26.6 million people.

Rejuvenation of the population, 1946 - 1960s 

After the Second World War, the population of the Soviet Union began to gradually recover itself to pre-war levels, by 1959 this had been surpassed with a registered 209,035,000 people over the 1941 population count of 196,716,000.

Population dynamics in the 1970s - 1980s 
The crude birth rate in the Soviet Union throughout its history had been decreasing - from 44.0 per thousand in 1926 to 18.0 in 1974, mostly due to urbanization and rising average age of marriages. The crude death rate had been gradually decreasing as well - from 23.7 per thousand in 1926 to 8.7 in 1974.  While death rates did not differ greatly across regions of the Soviet Union through much of Soviet history, birth rates in southern republics of Transcaucasia and Central Asia were much higher than those in the northern parts of the Soviet Union, and in some cases even increased in the post-World War II period. This was partly due to slower rates of urbanization and traditionally early marriages in southern republics.

As a result, mainly of differential birthrates, with most of the European nationalities moving toward sub-replacement fertility and the Central Asian and other nationalities of southern republics having well-above replacement-level fertility, the percentage who were Russians was gradually being reduced.  According to some Western scenarios of the 1990s, if the Soviet Union had stayed together it is likely that Russians would have lost their majority status in the 2000s (decade).  This differential could not be offset by assimilation of non-Russians by Russians, in part because the nationalities of southern republics maintained a distinct ethnic consciousness and were not easily assimilated.

The late 1960s and the 1970s witnessed a dramatic reversal of the path of declining mortality in the Soviet Union, and was especially notable among men in working ages, and also especially in Russia and other predominantly Slavic areas of the country. While not unique to the Soviet Union (Hungary in particular showed a pattern that was similar to Russia), this male mortality increase, accompanied by a noticeable increase in infant mortality rates in the early 1970s, drew the attention of Western demographers and Sovietologists at the time.

An analysis of the official data from the late 1980s showed that after worsening in the late 1970s and the early 1980s, the situation for adult mortality began to improve again.  Referring to data for the two decades ending in 1989–1990, while noting some abatement in adult mortality rates in the Soviet republics in the 1980s, Ward Kingkade and Eduardo Arriaga characterized this situation as follows:  "All of the former Soviet countries have followed the universal tendency for mortality to decline as infectious diseases are brought under control while death rates from degenerative diseases rise. What is exceptional in the former Soviet countries and some of their East European neighbors is that a subsequent increase in mortality from causes other than infectious disease has brought about overall rises in mortality from all causes combined. Another distinctive characteristic of the former Soviet case is the presence of unusually high levels of mortality from accidents and other external causes, which are typically associated with alcoholism."

The rising infant mortality rates in the Soviet Union in the 1970s became the subject of much discussion and debate among Western demographers. The infant mortality rate (IMR) had increased from 24.7 in 1970 to 27.9 in 1974. Some researchers regarded the rise in infant mortality as largely real, a consequence of worsening health conditions and services. Others regarded it as largely an artifact of improved reporting of infant deaths, and found the increases to be concentrated in the Central Asian republics where improvement in coverage and reporting of births and deaths might well have the greatest effect on increasing the published rates.

The rising reported adult mortality and infant mortality was not explained or defended by Soviet officials at the time. Instead, they simply stopped publishing all mortality statistics for ten years. Soviet demographers and health specialists remained silent about the mortality increases until the late 1980s when the publication of mortality data resumed and researchers could delve into the real and artificial aspects of the reported mortality increases.  When these researchers began to report their findings, they accepted the increases in adult male mortality as real and focused their research on explaining its causes and finding solutions. In contrast, investigations of the rise in reported infant mortality concluded that while the reported increases in the IMR were largely an artifact of improved reporting of infant deaths in the Central Asian republics, the actual levels in this region were much higher than had yet been reported officially. In this sense the reported rise in infant mortality in the Soviet Union as a whole was an artifact of improved statistical reporting, but reflected the reality of a much higher actual infant mortality level than had previously been recognized in official statistics.

As the detailed data series that was ultimately published in the late 1980s showed, the reported IMR for the Soviet Union as a whole increased from 24.7 in 1970 to a peak of 31.4 in 1976.  After that the IMR gradually decreased and by 1989 it had fallen to 22.7, which was lower than had been reported in any previous year (though close to the figure of 22.9 in 1971).  In 1989, the IMR ranged from a low of 11.1 in the Latvian SSR to a high of 54.7 in the Turkmen SSR.

Research conducted subsequent to the dissolution of the Soviet Union revealed that the originally reported mortality rates very substantially underestimated the actual rates, especially for infant mortality. This has been shown for Transcaucasian and Central Asian republics.

Population 

Russia lost former territories of the Russian Empire with about 30 million inhabitants after the Russian Revolution of 1917 (Poland: 18 million; Finland: 3 million; Romania: 3 million; the Baltic states: 5 million and Kars to Turkey: 400 thousand). At least 2 million citizens of the former Russian Empire died in the course of the Russian Civil War of 1917–1923, and a further 1 to 2 million emigrated. An estimated 800,000 to 1,200,000 people died during the purges of the 1930s.

According to the Russian Academy of Sciences the Soviet Union suffered 26.6 million deaths (1941-1945) during World War II, including an increase in infant mortality of 1.3 million. Total war-loss figures include territories annexed by the Soviet Union in 1939–1945.

Although the population growth-rate decreased over time, it remained positive throughout the history of the Soviet Union in all republics, and the population grew each year by more than 2 million except during periods of wartime, and famine.

Life expectancy and infant mortality
A newborn Soviet child in 1926–27 had a life expectancy of 44.4 years, up from 32.3 years in the Russian Empire thirty years before. By 1958–59, the life expectancy for newborns had reached 68.6 years. The life expectancy in the United States in 1958–59 was 66.2 for men and 72.9 for women. Life expectancy in the Soviet Union remained fairly stable during most years, although in the 1970s it decreased slightly.

Demographic statistics

The following demographic statistics are from the 1990 edition of the CIA World Factbook, unless otherwise indicated.

Population
Population: 290,644,721 (July 1992)

Population growth rate
0.4% (1992)

Crude birth rate
18 births/1,000 population (1990)

Crude death rate
10 deaths/1,000 population (1990)

Net migration rate
1 migrants/1,000 population (1990)

Infant mortality rate
24 deaths/1,000 live births (1990)

Life expectancy at birth
65 years male, 74 years female (1990)

Total fertility rate
2.4 children born/woman (1985)
2.528 children born/woman (1987)
2.26 children born/woman (1990)

Nationality
noun - Soviet(s); adjective - Soviet

Literacy
99.8% (1980)

Labor force
Labor force: 152,300,000 civilians; 80% industry and other nonagricultural fields, 20% agriculture; shortage of skilled labor (1989)

Organized labor: 98% of workers were union members; all trade unions are organized within the All-Union Central Council of Trade Unions (AUCCTU) and conduct their work under guidance of the Communist party. There was a market relationship between the people and the state as the employer; people were free to choose their job and leave if they wished, although members of the Communist Party of the Soviet Union could be ordered to work in certain places, but seldom were.

Abortion

Ethnic groups 

The Soviet Union was one of the world's most ethnically diverse countries, with more than 100 distinct national ethnicities living within its borders.

Other ethnic groups included Abkhaz, Adyghes, Aleuts, Assyrians, Avars, Bashkirs, Bulgarians, Buryats, Chechens, Chinese, Chuvash, Cossacks, Crimean Tatars, Evenks, Finns, Gagauz, Germans, Greeks, Hungarians, Ingushes, Inuit, Jews, Kalmyks, Karakalpaks, Karelians, Kets, Koreans, Lezgins, Maris, Mongols, Mordvins, Nenetses, Ossetians, Poles, Roma, Romanians, Tats, Tatars, Tuvans, Udmurts, and Yakuts. Dozens of these other ethnic groups were the titular nations of different Autonomous Soviet Socialist Republics or Autonomous Oblasts within the union-level republics (ex. Tatars in Tatar ASSR within the RSFSR, Abkhaz ASSR within Georgia) or had been previously (Volga German ASSR, Crimean ASSR).

Religion 

The Soviet Union promoted state atheism from 1928 to 1941, in which religion was largely discouraged and heavily persecuted. The USSR remained a secular state from 1945 until its dissolution. However, according to various Soviet and Western sources, over one-third of the country's people professed religious beliefs: Russian Orthodox 20%, Muslim 15%, Protestant, Georgian Orthodox, Armenian Orthodox, and Roman Catholic 7%, Jewish less than 1%, atheist 60% (1990 est.). Some indigenous pagan belief systems existed in the Siberian and Russian Far Eastern lands in the local populations.

Language 

Russian became the official language of the Soviet Union in 1990.  Until that time it was still necessary to have a language of common communication. The de facto result inevitably favored Russian, the native language of half Soviet citizens.

Overall Soviet citizens spoke more than 200 languages and dialects (at least 18 with more than 1 million speakers); Slavic group: 75%, other Indo-European: 8%, Altaic: 12%, Uralic: 3%, Caucasian: 2% (1990 est.)

See also
 Demographics of Central Asia
 Religion in the Soviet Union
 Family in the Soviet Union
 List of Russian censuses

References

General sources
 CIA World Factbook 1991 - most figures, unless attributed to another source.
 J. A. Newth: The 1970 Soviet Census, Soviet Studies vol. 24, issue 2 (October 1972) pp. 200–222. - Population figures from 1897 - 1970.
 The Russian State Archive of the Economy: Soviet Censuses of 1937 and 1939 - Population figures for 1937 and 1939. https://web.archive.org/web/20020927142010/http://www.library.yale.edu/slavic/census3739.html